Sükhbaatar (Axe Hero) is one of the 21 aimags of Mongolia, located in the east of the country. Its capital is Baruun-Urt. It is named after Damdin Sükhbaatar.

Population

Transportation 
The Baruun-Urt Airport (UUN/ZMBU) has one unpaved runway and is served by regular flights to Ulaanbaatar.

Administrative subdivisions 

The Aimag capital Baruun-Urt is geographically located within the Sükhbaatar sum, but administrated independently.

* - the aimag capital Baruun-Urt

See also 
Dariganga_Mongols

References 

 
Provinces of Mongolia
States and territories established in 1942
1942 establishments in Mongolia